Ralph Schoenman (born 1935) is an American left-wing activist who was a personal secretary to Bertrand Russell and became general secretary of the Bertrand Russell Peace Foundation. He was involved in a number of projects supported by Russell, including the Campaign for Nuclear Disarmament (CND), the Committee of 100 and an unofficial war crimes tribunal to try American leaders for their conduct in the Vietnam War. Shortly before his death in 1970, Russell publicly broke with Schoenman.

Life
Born in Brooklyn, New York, Schoenman was educated at Princeton University but then left the U.S. for Britain in 1958. He was involved in various protest activities during his student days and became active in the CND after arriving in Britain. This brought him into contact with Russell, for whom Schoenman began working in 1960. Bernard Levin wrote critically of Schoenman's influence on Russell, saying that Schoenman was partly responsible for Russell's virulent anti-Americanism, in contrast to his earlier pronouncements against communism. Russell said of Schoenman, "You know he is a rather rash young man, and I have to restrain him.".
 
In 1963, Schoenman participated as Russell's secretary in attempts to mediate a solution for the Sino-Indian border conflict, after China declared a ceasefire the previous year. For visiting communist China, the U.S. embassy in London put him under a travel restriction, stamping his passport as only valid to return to the U.S.

Schoenman was an organizer and member of the Russell Tribunal, an International War Crimes Tribunal which visited North Vietnam and Cambodia in 1966-1967. In addition to the group's own camera crews, Schoenman tried to negotiate network television coverage from NBC and CBS for the tribunal's visit to Hanoi, but was turned down in a dispute over the conditions. The networks charged that they had been asked to pay for the privilege and also felt that the restrictions proposed to them, including submitting footage for censorship, would imperil their objectivity. CBS News president Richard Salant said, "They are out to prove a point with investigations and they have an ax to grind". Schoenman denied the allegations that fees or censorship had been requested, while noting that the networks would pay to acquire footage from others, as ABC had done to obtain film from one of the tribunal's cameramen.

After making these visits, Schoenman argued in a hearing of the tribunal that the U.S. had committed genocide in Vietnam. He argued, "It is not possible to drop four million pounds of bombs every day on a country the size of New York and Pennsylvania without exterminating the civilian population".

During the course of the tribunal, the U.S. government revoked Schoenman's passport because of unauthorized visits to North Vietnam. In November 1967, he was deported back to the U.S. by Bolivian authorities when he traveled there to attend the trial of Régis Debray. As a result, he was prevented from attending the tribunal's proceedings in Copenhagen later that month because Danish authorities refused to allow him to enter without a passport. This led to a sequence in which Schoenman shuttled between several European countries, none of which would admit him, before illegally entering Britain, where he remained for 10 days until being deported in June 1968.

In December 1969, Russell made a public statement in that he had no contact with Schoenman and was unaware of his activities. Russell approved a vote to remove Schoenman from the board of the Bertrand Russell Peace Foundation.

Schoenman then founded the National Committee for a Citizens Commission of Inquiry on U.S. war crimes in Vietnam to document US war crimes in Vietnam. The Commission of Inquiry travelled around the US conducting hearings on alleged atrocities in Vietnam.

Later, Schoenman settled in Princeton, New Jersey, and was again able to travel, visiting Iran during the waning days of the Shah's government to raise awareness of the human rights violations of the U.S.-backed government. The new Provisional Revolutionary Government expelled him in March 1979.

Current activity

Since 2002 Schoenman has worked with documentary filmmaker, Mya Shone, providing commentary for radio stations in many parts of the United States and Canada, and produces the "Taking Aim" radio show, billed as "Uncompromising, fact intensive exposés of the hidden workings of a capitalist system addicted to permanent war".
In about 2009 they moved from broadcasting over WBAI to an Internet webcast.

Writings
 Death and Pillage in the Congo: A Study of Western Rule, 1965, 
 A Glimpse of American Crimes in Vietnam, 1967, 
 Bertrand Russell: Philosopher of the Century, 1968, 
 The Hidden History of Zionism, 1988, 
 Iraq and Kuwait: A History Suppressed, 1998,

References

External links
Th Hidden History of Zionism online, at Marxists Internet Archive. (Also available in Spanish)
Private Memorandum Concerning Ralph Schoenman, by Bertrand Russell
Irish parliamentary debate from May 1968 on the question of whether to admit Schoenman

1935 births
Living people
20th-century American Jews
American activists
21st-century American Jews